The British Royal Navy built a series of pre-dreadnought battleships as part of a naval expansion programme that began with the Naval Defence Act 1889. These ships were characterised by a main battery of four heavy guns—typically  guns—in two twin mounts, a secondary armament that usually comprised  guns, and a high freeboard. Primarily concerned with maintaining its "two-power standard" of numerical superiority over the combined French and Russian fleets, the Royal Navy built or purchased a total of fifty-two battleships of this type prior to the 1906 completion of the revolutionary all-big-gun , which gave the pre-dreadnoughts their name. William Henry White served as the Director of Naval Construction from 1885 to 1902 and thus oversaw the development of most of the pre-dreadnoughts.

The nine s followed as refinements of White's original design, and they proved to be widely influential as foreign navies copied their general characteristics. Six slightly smaller s intended for the China Station followed, after which White designed another tranche of eight larger battleships: three - and five very similar  ships. The latter were built as a stopgap while White completed work on the faster , which were intended to counter new Russian ships. A trend toward larger secondary batteries in foreign battleships led to the eight-ship , which carried  guns. A pair of small battleships originally built for the Chilean Navy—what became the —were purchased after the Chileans placed them for sale in 1903.

The ships built for the Royal Navy served in a variety of roles across the globe, seeing service in the Mediterranean, Home, and Atlantic Fleets, among others. The second-class ships generally operated abroad on the China Station or elsewhere in the British Empire. As newer ships came into service, older vessels were placed in reserve or converted for subsidiary duties, including serving as barracks ships and depot vessels. One vessel, was lost in an accidental grounding in 1906 and the oldest battleships of the Royal Sovereign and Centurion classes were broken up beginning in the early 1910s. With the start of the First World War in 1914, many of the vessels were mobilised for combat, and many served in the Dardanelles campaign, where five were lost to torpedoes and mines. Another five were sunk elsewhere during the war. The surviving vessels were all broken up in the post-war reduction in naval strength save one, which was converted into a radio-controlled target ship. She served in this role until 1927, when she was sold for scrap.



Royal Sovereign class

The Royal Sovereign class was authorised under the Naval Defence Act 1889, which established the "two-power standard" and led to a major naval construction programme. They were ordered in response to a war scare with the Russian Empire and a realisation that the fleet would be insufficient in the event of a conflict with France. The class is frequently regarded as the first of what would later become known as the pre-dreadnought battleship, as they marked a clear departure from the period of design experimentation that characterised ironclad battleship construction in the 1870s and 1880s. They introduced what became the standard form for battleships for the next fifteen years, which included a main battery of four heavy guns in a pair of two-gun mounts and a high freeboard suitable for operation on the high seas, though the development of modern gun turrets would come with subsequent designs. They were the first in a series of British battleships designed by William Henry White, the Director of Naval Construction (DNC); he was to be responsible for most of the pre-dreadnoughts built in Britain.

Starting in 1900, all members of the class in the Mediterranean were recalled to Britain for refits except Hood, and afterward they were placed in reserve by 1904–1905. Long-since obsolete by the early 1910s, the members of the class began to be discarded:  was broken up in 1911 and Empress of India was expended as a target ship in 1913. Royal Sovereign and Ramillies were scrapped that year, and Royal Oak and  followed in 1914. After the British entry into the First World War in August 1914, Hood was scuttled as a blockship to bar one of the entrances to Portland Harbour. Revenge was the only member of the class to see active service during the war, being used for coastal bombardment off Flanders. Converted to a barracks ship by late 1915, she was ultimately scrapped in 1919.

Centurion class

The Centurion class, also designed by White, completed the initial ten new battleships called for by the Naval Defence Act 1889. They were intended to serve as flagships of the Pacific and China Stations, and as such, their design differed significantly from the Royal Sovereigns, though they were in many respects a scaled-down version of White's previous design. Because they would operate abroad, they required a significantly greater cruising range, and because dry dock facilities were limited in East Asia and the Pacific, their hulls were coppered to reduce biofouling and allow them to go longer between hull cleanings. Their most likely opponent at the time would have been Russian armoured cruisers, so they carried a lighter main battery of  guns and thinner armour compared to the Royal Sovereigns.

 served as the flagship of the China Station from her commissioning while  was initially sent to the Mediterranean Fleet, where she also joined the International Squadron in 1897. She moved to Chinese waters in 1898, and both ships were involved in the suppression of the Boxer Uprising in China in 1900, during which they sent landing parties to participate in the Battle of the Taku Forts and the Battle of Tientsin. Both ships returned to Britain in 1901 for reconstruction and Centurion briefly served in the China Station until 1905, when the renewal of the Anglo-Japanese Alliance rendered the presence of a significant British squadron redundant. The two vessels were placed in reserve that year and saw little activity before being placed for sale in 1909 and scrapped the following year.

HMS Renown 

The 1892 construction programme had initially called for three new first-class battleships that were to be armed with a new  gun, but development of the gun was delayed. At the request of the Controller of the Navy, Rear Admiral John A. "Jacky" Fisher, and the Director of Naval Intelligence, Captain Cyprian Bridge, an improved Centurion design was prepared, despite the fact that no requirements for a third vessel of the second class existed. Another White design, Renown incorporated several advances, including the first use of Harvey armour in the Royal Navy, the first sloped armour deck, and the first adoption of modern, enclosed gun shields (which would come to be known as gun turrets). Fisher pressed for six of the vessels to be built instead of what was to become the Majestic class, but the Admiralty rejected the request on the grounds that the  main guns were insufficient for use against enemy battleships, and there was no need for large fleets of the vessels overseas.

Renown served as the flagship of the North America and West Indies Station, initially under Fisher's command. In 1899, she was refitted before being reassigned to the Mediterranean Fleet as its flagship, which was by then commanded by Fisher. In 1902, she was refitted again to carry the Duke and Duchess of Connaught on a royal tour of India, for which she was nicknamed the "battleship yacht". After a brief period in reserve in 1905, she received additional modifications for use as a royal yacht, and later that year she carried the Prince and Princess of Wales—the future King George V and Queen Mary—on a tour of India. She was used in a variety of subsidiary roles before being withdrawn from service in 1911 and broken up in 1914.

Majestic class

Intended for the 1892 programme, what was initially to have been a class of three ships was delayed to the following year as the new 12-inch gun they were designed to carry had not completed testing. The design, also prepared by White, incorporated the same advances first seen with Renown in a larger first-class battleship (though White had in fact designed Majestic first). Due to public criticism, John Spencer, the First Lord of the Admiralty, ordered a total of nine new battleships as part of the so-called Spencer Programme to allay concerns that the Royal Navy had fallen in strength relative to France and Russia. The Majestics became a benchmark of battleship design, and they were widely copied, both generally with characteristics like the calibre of the main battery, and literally in that the Japanese  and the battleship  were little more than minor improvements on the Majestics.

Most of the class joined the Channel Fleet on entering service and  became the fleet flagship. Caesar and Illustrious joined the rest of the class in the Channel Fleet in 1903 and 1904 respectively, while Victorious was transferred to the China Station from 1898 to 1900, before returning to the Mediterranean until 1904, when she, too, joined the Channel Fleet. In 1906, the ships were reduced to the reserve, assigned to the Nore, Portsmouth, and Devonport Divisions, seeing little activity until the First World War, when they were mobilised. They served in a variety of roles through the first year of the war, including escorting the British Expeditionary Force to France in 1914, and as part of the force waging the Dardanelles campaign. By that time, the ships of the class began to be withdrawn from service, disarmed, and reduced to subsidiary roles, including as depot ships, ammunition ships, and repair ships. Caesar, as a depot ship, was the last British pre-dreadnought to be used overseas when she supported the Allied intervention in the Russian Civil War in 1919. With no further use for the obsolete vessels, the Royal Navy sold the Majestics for scrap in the early 1920s.

Canopus class

While the Centurion class and Renown had been designed with Russian armoured cruisers in mind, the rise of the Imperial Japanese Navy as a major naval power in the mid-1890s led White to suggest more powerful battleships for the China Station. During the design process, Krupp armour became available, so the reduction in thickness accounted for less of a decrease in effective protection than the mathematics would imply. The weight savings actually allowed for more a comprehensive protection layout compared to earlier vessels. The Canopus class was the first British battleship design to use water-tube boilers. Six members of the class were built, and while they proved capable of the task for which they had been designed, many officers in the fleet were opposed to the nominal reduction in their belt armour effectiveness.

 initially served in the Mediterranean before joining her sisters on the China Station, though the Anglo-Japanese Alliance permitted their withdrawal in 1905, as with the Centurions. Upon returning to home waters, they were assigned to the Channel, Home, and Atlantic Fleets. At the start of war, the ships were mobilised and saw extensive service in various secondary theatres. Their age rendered them more expendable than the newer battleships of the Grand Fleet, and so they were used more aggressively than the vessels containing the German High Seas Fleet in the North Sea. Canopus was sent to join the hunt for the German East Asia Squadron; she missed the Battle of Coronel but fired the first shots in the Battle of the Falkland Islands. Several of the ships took part in the Dardanelles campaign in 1915, where Ocean and Goliath were sunk during the fighting. The surviving ships saw little activity after 1915, though Glory was the flagship of the British North Russia Squadron in 1916. The four ships were ultimately scrapped in the post-war reduction in the fleet's strength in 1919–1922.

Formidable class

The Formidable class arose as an improvement on the Majestic design, incorporating the innovations of the Canopus class—Krupp armour and water-tube boilers—along with a new, more powerful, 40-calibre 12 in gun. Belt thickness was to return to 9 in to address criticism of the Canopus design. The Formidable design used the same basic hull as the Majestic class, which was larger than the Canopus-class hull, but weight savings from the superior Krupp armour and improved propulsion systems allowed displacement to remain roughly the same as the Majestics. Hydrodynamic testing with a model allowed White and the design staff to make refinements to the hull shape that improved their handling characteristics.

They returned to the Home Fleet in 1911–1912, where they remained as part of the 5th Battle Squadron until the start of war in 1914. The 5th Squadron was stationed in the English Channel at the start of the war, and Formidable was torpedoed there in the early hours of 1 January 1915 by the U-boat . Irresistible was sent to the Dardanelles campaign, where she was lost to Ottoman naval mines in March. Implacable was then sent to replace her, and she was present for the landings at Cape Helles and at Anzac Cove in April. Following the failure of the Gallipoli campaign, she was sent to Greece before returning to Britain in 1917 and reduced to a depot ship, ultimately being scrapped in 1921.

London class

The London class were, in most respects, repeats of the Formidable design, which has led some historians, like Tony Gibbons, to treat them as one class. Significant changes with the ships' armour layout have led most historians to classify them as a separate class. The first three members of the class were ordered in 1898 in response to Russian naval construction; White had been in the process of preparing the next design, which became the Duncan class, but the need to begin construction immediately led him to delay the Duncans in favour of a modified Formidable. The chief alterations lay with the arrangement of the armour in the ships' bows. Instead of terminating the heavy belt armour at the forward barbette with a transverse bulkhead, White discarded the heavy bulkhead and extended the belt all the way to the stem, albeit with reduced thickness. Two further ships, Queen and Prince of Wales, sometimes regarded as a separate class themselves, were begun in 1901 after work on the Duncan class had begun.

Like the Formidables, all five Londons were assigned to the Mediterranean Fleet before being recalled to Britain between 1907 and 1909, thereafter serving with the various fleets in home waters, ultimately ending up in the 5th Battle Squadron by 1912. In 1912 and 1913,  was used in experiments with a flying-off ramp for aircraft. The ships served with 5th Squadron during the first months of the war, though in November,  was destroyed by an accidental magazine explosion.  was used to bombard German positions in Flanders in October and November 1914, while the other three members of the class were sent to the Dardanelles. Venerable joined them there in mid-1915, but by the end of 1916  had been reduced to a depot ship and London and Venerable had returned to Britain to be decommissioned;  joined them there in early 1917. As with the other surviving pre-dreadnoughts, all four ships were sold for scrap in 1920.

Duncan class

White developed the revised bow protection scheme that had been incorporated into the Londons as a stopgap whilst he completed work on the Duncans. For much the same reason that naval officers disliked the Canopus class, the Duncans were seen to be an inferior design. Despite their defensive limitations, the Duncan-class ships were the fastest battleships in the world at the time of their completion. A total of six ships were ordered, four in 1898 and two more in 1899.

All six ships served with the Mediterranean Fleet from their commissioning until 1905, when they were recalled to the Channel Fleet.  ran aground on Lundy Island in May 1906 and proved to be a total loss. The surviving ships were moved to the Atlantic Fleet in 1907 and then to the Home Fleet by 1912. They were constituted as the 6th Battle Squadron, and at the start of the First World War, the ships were used to strengthen the Northern Patrol, which enforced the blockade of Germany. During this period, they were reassigned to the 3rd Battle Squadron, Grand Fleet. The three survivors were all broken up between 1919 and 1920.

King Edward VII class

By the early 1900s, several foreign navies began building battleships with heavy secondary batteries, including the American  and the Italian , both of which carried  guns compared to the standard British armament of  guns. When design work on what would become the King Edward VII class started in 1901, White's staff (initially without White himself, who was ill) submitted a proposal that carried  guns in four wing turrets. The increase in calibre brought significant problems, however, since the weight high in the ship rendered the vessels prone to severe rolling and forced the designers to reduce freeboard. They also suffered the same fate as many late pre-dreadnoughts, being completed shortly before the advent of the all-big-gun  in 1906. They were the last battleships designed during White's tenure as DNC.

All of the ships were sent to the Mediterranean during the First Balkan War in 1912. During the First World War, they operated with the Grand Fleet, but they did not see action during this period. In January 1916, King Edward VII struck a mine and sank. The six surviving members of the class were broken up in the early 1920s.

Swiftsure class

The two Swiftsure-class ships mark a significant departure from the other pre-dreadnought battleships built by Britain during the period, primarily because they had not been built for the Royal Navy. During the Argentine–Chilean naval arms race, Chile ordered the two battleships—to have been named Constitución and Libertad—from British shipyards in response to a pair of Argentinian armoured cruisers that had been ordered from Italy. Since they were intended to combat cruisers, the designers opted for a second-class ship armed with 10 in guns and a relatively heavy secondary battery of  guns. Britain brokered the Pacts of May that ended the race. After Russia sought to purchase Chile's battleships, Britain intervened and bought them to prevent the Russians from strengthening their fleet at the expense of Britain's ally Japan. Relatively minor work was required to bring them up to British standards, primarily centring around modifying the guns to accept British ammunition.

Swiftsure became the flagship of the East Indies Station in 1913 and Triumph was sent to the China Station that year. Swiftsure escorted troopship convoys in the Indian Ocean at the start of the war, while Triumph joined the search for the East Asia Squadron and then participated in the Siege of Tsingtao. Both ships were transferred to the Dardanelles campaign in 1915, and Triumph was torpedoed and sunk by U-21 two days before the latter also sank Majestic. Swiftsure was reassigned to the 9th Cruiser Squadron in early 1916 for convoy operations in the Atlantic before being paid off in 1917 to free up crews for anti-submarine vessels. She was ultimately scrapped in 1920.

Lord Nelson class

Developments in naval gunnery and torpedo technology were pushing expected battle ranges to greater distances in the early 1900s, since effective fire could be opened at greater range and the increased capabilities of torpedoes would discourage short-range fighting. At greater ranges, lighter guns had less use, pointing the way to the development of dreadnought battleships. Philip Watts, who replaced White as DNC in 1902, began the design process with studies that demonstrated the traditional 6 in gun would be of little use, and so prepared design variants with an armament of only 12 in and  guns (and light anti-torpedo boat guns) and a uniform battery of 10 in weapons. The Admiralty approved a design with four 12 in and twelve 9.2 in guns in August 1903; but, when it became clear that the ships would be too large for some existing dock facilities, Watts had to make revisions that included reducing the secondary battery by two guns.

Lord Nelson became the flagship of the Nore Division, to which Agamemnon was also assigned. After the start of the war, both vessels were transferred to the Channel Fleet and covered the crossing of the British Expeditionary Force to France. They then joined the fleet off the Dardanelles in 1915 and spent the rest of the war in the eastern Mediterranean to guard against a sortie by the ex-German battlecruiser , now under Ottoman control as Yavuz Sultan Selim. Neither Lord Nelson-class ship was able to reach the area in time to intervene in the Battle of Imbros when the Ottoman vessel surprised and sank a pair of monitors. After the war, Lord Nelson was scrapped in 1920, while Agamemnon survived for several years as a radio-controlled target ship, ultimately being broken up in 1927. She was, by that time, the last British pre-dreadnought still in existence.

See also

 List of battleships

Footnotes

Notes

Citations

References

Further reading
 
 

Lists of Royal Navy ships by type
 
Royal Navy
Royal Navy